Christina Horiatopoulos (born 19 November 1983) is an Australian retired tennis player.

Horiatopoulos reached a career-high doubles ranking of world No. 126 on 26 February 2007 and her highest singles ranking of 326 on 25 November 2002.

Her favourite surface is grass. She started playing tennis at the age of five. Horiatopoulos retired from professional tennis 2008.

She also is the Director of the Christina Horiatopoulos Professional Tennis Academy.

ITF Circuit finals

Singles (0–1)

Doubles (8–8)

External links
 
 

1983 births
Australian people of Greek descent
Australian female tennis players
Sportswomen from New South Wales
Tennis players from Sydney
Living people